Nganzai is a Local Government Area of Borno State in northeastern Nigeria. Its headquarters are in the town of Gajiram.

Land Mass 
It has an area of 2,467 km and a population of 99,799 at the 2006 census.

Postal Code 
The postal code of the area is 612.

History 
It is one of the sixteen LGAs that constitute the Borno Emirate, a traditional state located in Borno State.

Jihadist groups carried out massacres in July 2019 and June 2020.

References

Local Government Areas in Borno State